The Mejlis of the Crimean Tatar People is the single highest executive-representative body of the Crimean Tatars in period between sessions of the Qurultay of the Crimean Tatar People. The Mejlis is a member institution of the Platform of European Memory and Conscience.

The Mejlis was outlawed by Russia in 2016 for "the use of propaganda of aggression and hatred towards Russia, inciting ethnic nationalism and extremism in society" and listed as an extremist organization two years after the 2014 Russian annexation of Crimea. In April 2017, the International Court of Justice delivered its order on the request for the indication of provisional measures, according to which Russia must lift the ban; Russia has since ignored and refused to comply with the binding decision.

History
The current Mejlis was founded in 1991, to act as a representative body for the Crimean Tatars which could address grievances to the Ukrainian central government, the Crimean government, and international bodies. In its activities Mejlis is subordinated to Qurultai, guided by its decisions, current regulations, the Mejlis of the Crimean Tatar people statute, norms of international law and legislative acts of Ukraine not contradicting with these standards. The main goal of the Mejlis is the liquidation of consequences of genocide conducted by the Soviet state in regard to the Crimean Tatars (Surgun of 1944), reinstatement of national and political rights of the Crimean Tatar people and realization of their rights on the free national state self-determination on its national territory. Mejlis of the Crimean Tatar people consists of 33 members including the Mejlis chair person. Simferopol is the location of Mejlis.

On June 30, 1991, the Mejlis declared its sovereignty over the Crimean Tatars, and adopted the Crimean Tatar's national anthem and national flag. Also, the Crimean Tatars elected 14 Crimean Tatar Deputies to the Verkhovna Rada of Crimea. These 14 deputies were the first Crimean Tatar representatives in the Crimean Parliament in over 50 years.

During the 1998 parliamentary elections, members of the Mejlis joined the Rukh election list.

During the 2002, 2006, and 2007 parliamentary elections, members of the Mejlis joined the Our Ukraine election list.

On April 6, 2010, several pro-Russian Crimean political leaders in Crimea demanded the disbanding and banning of the Mejlis and all other forms of political representation for the Crimean Tatars (including the Kurultai), claiming that they were "organized criminal groups and said their activities are unconstitutional." Crimean Tatar organizations  urged President Viktor Yanukovych to "protect Crimea's indigenous people from discrimination".

During the 2012 parliamentary elections, members of the Mejlis joined the All-Ukrainian Union "Fatherland" election list. Since 2012, Mejlis is member of the Platform of European Memory and Conscience.

The status of Mejlis was legalized by the Presidential decree of May 18, 1999 "About the council of representatives of Crimean Tatar people". In 2010, the President of Ukraine Viktor Yanukovych reformed the council cutting it almost in half and establishing control over it by appointing its members by the President of Ukraine.

From its foundation in 1991 until 2013, its chairman was Mustafa Dzhemilev). Since October 2013, the chairman is Refat Chubarov. The Mejlis's deputy leader is İlmi Ümerov.

On 20 March 2014, two days after the annexation of Crimea by Russia, the Ukrainian parliament officially and explicitly recognized the Mejlis as the executive body of the Qurultay of the Crimean Tatar People, while the Qurultay was recognized as the higher representative body of the Crimean Tatar people. The Ukrainian parliament also recognized the Crimean Tatars as indigenous people of Ukraine.

In March 2014, following the ousting of the Ukrainian president in the 2014 Ukrainian revolution and the subsequent takeover of Crimea by pro-Russian separatists and Russian special forces, local authorities held a referendum on "reunification with Russia", the official result of which was a large majority in support. The Mejlis boycotted the referendum. Russia then officially annexed Crimea late March 2014. (Ukraine does not recognise the annexation and, backed by most of the international community, continues to assert its right over the peninsula.) After the annexation, most Mejlis members did not cooperate with the new Russian-Crimean authorities; of the six members that did, one became deputy speaker of the Crimean parliament, and another became head of the Crimean State Committee for Interethnic Relations and Deported Peoples.

In May 2014, Crimean Tatar leader Mustafa Dzhemilev was prevented from entering Crimea, resulting in Crimean Tatars organizing large protests and a failed attempt to help Dzhemilev enter Crimea after Crimean Tatars broke through a border checkpoint. In response, Crimean authorities accused the Mejlis of extremist activity regarding "illegal" gatherings marked by "violence and threats of violence", warning that the Mejlis could be dissolved and outlawed across Russia.

On 3 July 2014, it was announced that for the first time, Mejlis would hold its session outside of Crimea in Henichesk.

Russian law enforcement seized the Mejlis building in Simferopol on 20 September 2014.

The Mejlis was labeled an extremist organisation by Russian authorities in Crimea and banned by the Russian-appointed supreme court there on 26 April 2016. According to Regional Prosecutor General Natalia Poklonskaya, it was banned because its leaders had sought to destabilise Crimea since the 2014 annexation of Crimea by Russia through the use of "propaganda of aggression and hatred towards Russia, inciting ethnic nationalism and extremism in society". The Mejlis was also said to be responsible for stopping all cargo traffic between (mainland) Ukraine and Crimea in the autumn of 2015 and a late November series of explosions that damaged voltage power lines leading to a massive Crimean power outage. The Mejlis denied involvement in these events. (Also on 26 April 2016) Council of Europe's Commissioner for Human Rights Nils Muižnieks urged the court to reverse the ban since he believed "Equating (the Mejlis) with extremism paves the way for stigmatisation and discrimination of a significant part of the Crimean Tatar community and sends a negative message to that community as a whole". Exiled in mainland Ukraine, Chairman of the Mejlis Refat Chubarov stated the court's decision was unjustifiable and that "The occupiers in Crimea are doing everything to crush Crimean Tatars and force everyone to be silent". Amnesty International stated the ban "demolishes one of the few remaining rights of a minority that Russia must protect instead of persecute". Deputy Chairman of the Mejlis  vowed that the organization would try to continue its work despite the ban, saying "it will continue working in Ukraine and other countries".

Deputy head of the Mejlis İlmi Ümerov was on 7 September 2016 released after a three weeks' involuntary detention for tests of his "mental capacity" in a psychiatric hospital in Simferopol (doctors ruled him entirely sane) after stating on TV that Crimea should be returned to Ukraine. Ümerov was then charged with calling for Russia's borders to be changed, a charge punishable up to five years in jail.

The Supreme Court of Russia upheld the ban on 29 September 2016. The Mejlis is contesting this ban in the European Court of Human Rights.

On 1 October 2016 (Russian-Crimean government), Head of the Republic of Crimea, Sergei Aksyonov, explained that Natalia Poklonskaya accused Mejlis in energy blockade through diversion. The same day Aksyonov's Vice-Prime Minister Dmitry Polonsky claimed that Mejlis is a puppet organization of the United States Department of State.

By late December 2016, nine Mejlis members were in mainland Ukraine, in Russia, or in self-imposed exile. One was imprisoned, and more than 10 had been charged with criminal and administrative offences in Crimea.

In April 2017, the UN International Court of Justice made an interim order against the Russian Federation to allow Crimean Tatar Mejlis activities, and in July 2018, reminded Russia of its legal obligation.

On 28 February 2022, the Mejlis of the Crimean Tatar People stated it would recognize the Russian Federation, which it described as "a terrorist state", as international criminals over Russia's invasion of Ukraine.

See also
Majlis

Notes

References

External links
 Center of the Information and Documentation of Crimean Tatars — Statute on Mejlis of the Crimean Tatar people 
 Official site of Mejlis of the Crimean Tatar People 

Politics of the Crimean Tatars
Politics of Crimea
Ethnicity in politics
Members of the Unrepresented Nations and Peoples Organization
Euromaidan
Annexation of Crimea by the Russian Federation
Unicameral legislatures
Platform of European Memory and Conscience
Political organizations based in Ukraine
Crimean Tatar organizations